Platyptilia comorensis is a moth of the family Pterophoridae. It is known from the Comoros in the Indian Ocean.

References

comorensis
Endemic fauna of the Comoros
Moths of the Comoros
Moths described in 1994